Jack Lake is a dispersed rural community and unincorporated place in the municipality of Havelock-Belmont-Methuen, Peterborough County in Central Ontario, Canada. The community is on the northwest shore of Jack Lake, in the Kawartha lakes region, and parts of the community extend to the west into the neighbouring municipality of North Kawartha.

References

Communities in Peterborough County